Kajang Dispersal Link Expressway, SILK, also known as Kajang SILK Highway (Malay: Sistem Lingkaran-Lebuhraya Kajang), is an expressway built to disperse and regulate the traffic flow in Kajang, Selangor, Malaysia. The  expressway is to allow motorists to bypass the town centre of Kajang. It is also useful as the main ring road of Kajang.

The Kilometre Zero is located at Mines Interchange near Seri Kembangan.

History
Kajang Dispersal Link Expressway used to be called Jalan Kajang–Puchong (Jalan Sungai Chua on Kajang town side) 11 and Jalan Balakong 3211. The huge traffic jams that clogged traffic flow in Kajang town centre were the main reason behind the construction of the highway. Construction began in 2002. The expressway was completed in 2003 and began operation on 15 June 2004.

Features

Kajang Dispersal Link Expressway is fully lit at night and has 11 multi-level interchanges. The expressway uses the Touch 'n Go and Smart TAG electronic payment systems. The expressway has computerized traffic information display and monitoring system and 24-hour highway patrol. The expressway concessionaire offers emergency and vehicle breakdown assistance.

Tolls
The Kajang Dispersal Link Expressway uses opened toll systems. In October 2022, it was one of the four expressways maintained by PROLINTAS to have its toll rates deducted between 8% to 15%.

Electronic Toll Collections (ETC)
As part of an initiative to facilitate faster transaction at the Sungai Long, Bukit Kajang, Sungai Ramal and Sungai Balak Toll Plazas, all toll transactions at four toll plazas on the Kajang Dispersal Link Expressway have been conducted electronically via Touch 'n Go cards or SmartTAGs since 1 June 2016.

Toll rates
(Starting 20 October 2022)

List of interchanges

Main Link

Sungai Ramal–Sungai Balak Link

References

External links
Kajang Dispersal Link Expressway

2004 establishments in Malaysia
Ring roads in Malaysia
Expressways in Malaysia
Expressways and highways in the Klang Valley